Lakshmipur-3 is a constituency represented in the Jatiya Sangsad (National Parliament) of Bangladesh since 2014 by A.K.M. Shahjahan Kamal of Awami League.

Boundaries 
The constituency encompasses Laxmipur Sadar except: 1. North Hamsadi, 2. South Hamsadi, 3. Dalal Bazar, 4. Char Ruhita, 5. Parbati Nagar, 6. Shakchar, 7. Tumchar, 8. Char Ramanimohan, and 9. Bakshipur.

History

Members of Parliament

Elections

Elections in the 2010s 

A.K.M. Shahjahan Kamal from Bangladesh Awami League won uncontested.

Elections in the 2000s

References 

Parliamentary constituencies in Bangladesh
Lakshmipur District